A bee tree is a tree in which a colony of honey bees makes its home. A colony of bees may live in a bee tree for many years. Most bee trees have a large inner hollow, often with an upper and lower entrance.

Colonies in trees have fixed comb, so inspection and management is impossible, as is most harvesting without destroying the colony.  A beekeeper can perform a cut-out on a gum hive. The trunk is cut open to expose the cavity, and the comb is carefully removed and strapped into standard frames. The frames are then put to a conventional hive, such as a Langstroth hive. The bees will follow into the new hive especially if the queen and brood can be transferred.

If the tree is cut down and the trunk section containing the colony is removed, the result is a log gum or gum hive. A log gum is essentially a bee tree cut into a short section that contained a colony of honey bees. It got its name from the fact that when gum trees die they rot from the inside out, thereby creating a large cavity in which bees would commonly nest. These hives are fixed comb hives and, therefore, medicating and inspecting is almost impossible.

Beekeeping
Trees